Fraidy Cat may refer to:
 Fraidy Cat (film), a 1942 cartoon featuring Tom and Jerry
 "Fraidy Cat" (Garfield and Friends), a season 1 episode of Garfield and Friends
 "Fraidy Cat", a season 4 episode of The Garfield Show
 Fraidy Cat (TV series), a cartoon series from 1975
 Fraidy Cat (2008 film), an animated horror short film

See also
 Scaredy Cat, a 1948 Merrie Melodies cartoon, directed by Chuck Jones featuring Porky Pig